Captain Submarine (branded since 2002 as Capt. Submarine) is a Canadian fast-food restaurant chain whose menu is highlighted by submarine sandwiches. The first restaurant opened in 1972 in Charlottetown. Owned by Grinner's Food Systems, there are currently 23 locations in Atlantic Canada, and 4 in Ontario.

They offer online ordering and delivery in certain areas.

See also
List of Canadian restaurant chains
List of who owns what

References

External links
 Captain Submarine Website

Fast-food chains of Canada
Canadian brands